Flag Pond may refer to the following places in the United States:

Flag Pond, Tennessee, unincorporated community in Unicoi County
Flag Pond Landing, Virginia, unincorporated community in Accomack County
Flag Ponds Nature Park, a nature preserve located in St. Leonard, Maryland